The GM Ecotec engine, also known by its codename L850, is a family of all-aluminium inline-four engines, displacing between 1.4 and 2.5 litres. While these engines were based on the GM Family II engine, the architecture was substantially re-engineered for the new Ecotec application produced since 2000. This engine family replaced the GM Family II engine, the GM 122 engine, the Saab H engine, and the Quad 4 engine. It is manufactured in multiple locations, to include Spring Hill Manufacturing, in Spring Hill, Tennessee while the engine block and cylinder heads are cast at Saginaw Metal Casting Operations in Saginaw, Michigan.

Generation I

The 'Ecotec' name was adopted in 1994 for the new generation of Family II engines (2000 in North America) . The name was already used for the Opel GM Family II engine, Family 1 and Family 0 ranges. GM intended this new Ecotec to become its global 4-cylinder, and it has already fully replaced their OHV I4 line.

The Ecotec engine is a DOHC 4-valve design with a lost foam cast aluminum block and head (L850 for 86 mm bore applications, and L880 for 88 mm bore), designed for displacements from 1.8 to 2.4 L. Development began in 1994, by an international team of engineers and technicians from Opel's International Technical Development Center in Rüsselsheim, Germany, GM Powertrain in Pontiac, Michigan, and Saab in Södertälje, Sweden. Much of the development work on this project was carried out by Lotus Engineering, Hethel, United Kingdom. The engine uses aluminium pistons and cast iron cylinder liners. Vibration is reduced with twin balance shafts.

The first engine in the Ecotec Gen I line-up was Ecotec 2.2 L61, introduced in May 1999.

The current Ecotec line is manufactured in Tonawanda, New York,.

2.0

LK9

This engine is also known as B207 when used by Saab and Z20NET by Opel for use in the Vectra C and Signum.

LK9 is a turbocharged  version of the L850 (86 mm bore) series Ecotec utilizing an all-new reinforced sand cast aluminum cylinder head and upgraded internal components. The engine features a five-bearing forged steel crankshaft, strengthened connecting rods, redesigned pistons, piston oil cooling jets, reprofiled camshafts and an integrated oil cooler. The exhaust valves are liquid sodium-cooled. All vehicles using this engine feature Saab's Trionic 8 (T8) engine management system as well as a revised valve train. The timing chain and timing gears are also new, along with Saab's Direct Ignition system. The reinforcements, turbocharging, intercooling, internals, dual overhead camshaft, and such were developed by GM Powertrain Sweden (Saab Automobile Powertrain). It features an  bore and stroke and a 9.5:1 compression ratio.
 2003–2014 Saab 9-3 - B207E, B207L, B207R
 2003–2008 Opel Vectra - Z20NET (rebadged B207L)
 2003–2008 Opel Signum - Z20NET (rebadged B207L)
 2006–2010 Cadillac BLS - B207L, B207R

LSJ

The LSJ is a supercharged version of the LK9 Ecotec  with an Eaton M62 Roots-type supercharger and air-to-liquid intercooler. The LSJ shares many of its components with the LK9 such as: piston cooling jets, oil cooler, pistons, connecting rods, crankshaft, oil pan, sodium-filled exhaust valves and cylinder head. With the end of the Chevy Cobalt S/C SS and Saturn Ion Red Line, the LSJ was discontinued after 2007. In late 2005 Brammo Motorsports struck a deal with GM for the Supercharged 2.0 L Ecotec for their Ariel Atom.

The LSJ was on the Ward's 10 Best Engines list for 2006.

This engine is used in:

2.2

L61

This engine is also known as a Z22SE in other countries such as the United Kingdom, Australia, and Europe.

The basic Family II architecture was substantially re-engineered in 2000 to become the Ecotec Gen I. Unlike its notably harsh predecessor, the engine was designed for smoothness. Dual in-block balance shafts were integral to the design, the power-steering pump was mounted directly to the cylinder head and driven by the intake camshaft, the water-pump housing was cast into the block, and the A/C compressor and alternator were mounted directly on the block without brackets. The oil filter housing was cast into the block with a removable cover and replaceable paper element. It did not use an EGR valve. The Ecotec line is manufactured in Tonawanda, New York and Kaiserslautern, Germany, and was also manufactured for Saturn in Spring Hill, Tennessee until Saturn's discontinuation. In North America this engine replaced both the Quad-4 and the GM 122 engines and first appeared in the 2000 Saturn L-Series.

The L61 is a  version with a lost-foam cast aluminum cylinder head and block; it features an  bore and  stroke  and either a 9.5:1 compression ratio or a 10.0:1.

The Ecotec 2.2, model L61 first appeared in the 2000 Saturn LS1; the L61-powered Saturn Ion also replaced the Saturn-powered Saturn S-Series.

There are a few variations to the standard L61. The 2003 Saturn L-Series has a high output version with higher (10:1) compression and more aggressive camshaft. The 2004–2008 Chevrolet Malibu uses a version with electronic throttle control and a special unitized exhaust manifold and catalytic converter. The Malibu and Saturn versions also use return-less fuel injection. The 2002 Saturn VUE was the first North American variant of the L61 to be equipped with electronic throttle control, whereas other applications did not arise until 2005 in the Saturn ION and Chevrolet Cobalt. For 2007, introduced an updated version of the L61 based on the Gen II design.

The supercharger and inlet manifold from the 2.0 Ecotec LSJ engine can be purchased as an official kit from GM and along with modified software in the ECM, can create a 2.2 supercharged version of this engine.

The L61 was used in the following cars:

This engine also powered the Japanese-market Subaru Traviq, a badge-engineered Opel Zafira A.

Following the GM-Fiat agreement, the 2.2 L engine is also used in
 Fiat Croma unmodified
 Alfa Romeo 159 heavy modified with Gasoline direct injection

Z22YH

 2003 Opel/Vauxhall Vectra
 2003 Opel/Vauxhall Signum
 2005 Opel/Vauxhall Zafira
 2006–2009 Holden Astra (Australia and New Zealand only)

L42
The Ecotec 2.2, model L42 is the CNG version of the Ecotec 2.2.
Applications:
 2003–2004 Chevrolet Cavalier

Generation II

2.0 LNF (Z20NHH Opel) 

A turbocharged direct injected (redubbed Spark Ignition Direct Injection) Ecotec was introduced in the 2007 Pontiac Solstice GXP and Saturn Sky Red Line. In these applications, the engine is mounted longitudinally. Engine redline is at 6300 rpm and premium fuel is recommended. The sodium filled exhaust valves were based on technology developed for the Corvette V8 powertrains. The sodium fuses and becomes a liquid at idle, which improves conductivity and draws heat away from the valve face and valve guide towards the stem to be cooled by the engine oil circulating in this area. The "Gen II" block is similar to the 2.4 L and also features VVT technology. The Gen II block was developed using data from racing programs and computer simulations. The coolant jackets were expanded to improve heat transfer, resulting in a coolant capacity increase of 0.5 liters.

The kit retailed for $650 and includes remapped engine calibration and upgraded 3 MAP sensors. The kit is covered by the cars' existing GM warranties. Boost pressure was increased from 18psi (1.24 bar) to 21psi (1.44 bar).

Unique LNF features include:
 a twin-scroll turbocharger
 cam-driven high-pressure gasoline direct injection fuel system
 dual camshaft continuously variable valve timing
 sodium-filled stainless steel Inconel exhaust valves
 low-friction cast aluminum pistons with oil squirters
 forged steel crankshaft
 forged steel connecting rods
 cast stainless steel exhaust manifold
 foam cast gen2 block
 bosch injectors 0 261 500 055 or slightly larger 0 261 500 089 injectors in 2010 models

This engine is used in:

2.0 LDK (A20NHT Opel) 

An updated variant of the LNF (also with 9.2:1 compression ratio) was released in 2008, meeting the Euro 5 emission standard. This engine is also known as A20NHT by GM Powertrain Europe.

Unique LDK features include:
 a twin-scroll turbocharger
 cam-driven high-pressure gasoline direct injection fuel system
 dual camshaft continuously variable valve timing
 sodium-filled stainless steel Inconel exhaust valves
 low-friction cast aluminum pistons with oil squirters
 forged steel crankshaft
 cast stainless steel exhaust manifold
 foam cast gen2 block
 bosch injectors 0 261 500 055

This engine is used in:

LHU (A20NFT Opel)

LHU adds E85 flex-fuel capability to the LDK. This engine is also known as A20NFT by GM Powertrain Europe. Maximum engine speed is listed at 6350 rpm.

Unique LHU features include:
 a twin-scroll turbocharger
 cam-driven high-pressure gasoline direct injection fuel system
 dual camshaft continuously variable valve timing
 sodium-filled stainless steel Inconel exhaust valves
 low-friction cast aluminum pistons with oil squirters
 forged steel crankshafts
 cast stainless steel exhaust manifold
 sand-cast gen3 block
 larger bosch injectors 0 261 500 112 with ethanol safe seals due to flex fuel compatibility

Note: The A20NFT engine in Opel Astra K TCR car had swapped the original direct fuel injection into multi-point fuel injection.

2.2

L61
In 2007, the L61 received a multitude of changes, that originated from the LE5. It switched to the higher-strength Gen II block and received a revised cylinder head (enlarged exhaust ports) and camshaft design (increased exhaust valve duration). The engine also switched from wasted spark ignition to individual coil-on-plug ignition; this forced the cam cover to be redesigned. It was also switched to an E37 engine controller with new crank and cam sensors (replacing timing sensor previously found in ignition cassette). These changes increase horsepower slightly and allow the engine to meet PZEV standards. Compression ratio is 10.0:1.

The L61 was used in the following cars:

LAP
The LAP is a  version of the Ecotec, based on the Gen II block with cylinder head improvements, new camshaft design, E37 engine control module, 58X crankshaft reluctor ring, dual variable valve timing, digital crank and cam sensors, individual coil-on-plug ignition, vented starter solenoid, new MAP sensor, new intake manifold seals, new oil filter element, a 32-bit computer, and improved emissions performance.

Compression ratio is 10.0:1. Major features that set it apart from the 2.2 L L61 are variable-valve-timing and other cylinder head improvements from the 2.4 L LE5.

LE8
The LE8 is an E85 compatible  version of the LAP Ecotec. Compression ratio is 10.0:1 and the engine can run on both regular unleaded gasoline or E85.

2.4

LE5

The LE5 is a larger  version of the Ecotec. Both the  bore and  stroke are larger, and Variable Valve Timing on the intake and exhaust improve low-end torque. Compression is 10.4:1. Power is 164–177 hp (123–132 kW) and torque is 159–170 lb·ft (215–230 N·m). The engine uses a reinforced "Gen II" block. Connecting Rods are GKN Forged. C70 Powdered Metal from July 2007 on.

The LE5 is also used in the following overseas models:
 2006 GM Taiwan Buick LaCrosse
 2006 Shanghai GM Buick LaCrosse
 Buick GL8

The LE5 or a close variant is also used in the Polaris Slingshot (announced July 27, 2014), coupled with a 5-speed manual transmission and a final belt drive. The Slingshot is a three-wheeled side-by-side street vehicle, classed as a motorcycle.

LAT
The LAT is the designation used for the 2.4 L LE5 when used in GM's BAS mild hybrid vehicles.

LE9
The LE9 is an E85 compatible version of the  LE5 Ecotec.

LAF
The LAF is a direct injected 2.4 L. It uses technology based on GM's other four-cylinder direct injection applications, but with unique features designed for its specific application. This includes an 11.2:1 compression ratio that helps build power, slightly dished pistons that increase combustion efficiency and injectors with an application-specific flow rate.

LEA
The LEA is an E85 compatible variant of the LAF. Bore, stroke, and compression ratio all remain the same. Maximum engine speed is listed at 7000 rpm.to 799

LUK
The LUK is similar to the LAF, but adds the eAssist mild-hybrid system. Maximum engine speed is listed at 7000 rpm.

Generation III

2.0

LTG
A  turbocharged direct injection version of the gen III Ecotec was available in the 2013 Cadillac ATS and Chevrolet Malibu. This engine is also available in the Cadillac XTS and Cadillac XT5 in the Chinese market. Bore and stroke are both , and compression is 9.5:1. The engine uses a twin-scroll turbocharger with electronically controlled wastegate/bypass valve, air-to-air intercooler, stainless steel dual-scroll (1–4, 2–3) exhaust manifold designed to withstand  turbine temperature, and a rotacast aluminum alloy (A356T6) cylinder head with sodium-filled exhaust valves. Maximum engine speed is listed at 7000 rpm.

LSY
A successor to the LTG debuted in the 2019 Cadillac XT4 and the 2019 Cadillac CT6. The LSY adds Active Fuel Management and a start-stop system, putting more priority to fuel economy than performance. Peak output is lower than the LTG, but is achieved at lower rpm for both power and torque.

2.5

LCV
First appearing in the 2013 Chevrolet Malibu and 2013 Cadillac ATS, the 2.5 L Gen III block has been reworked to reduce engine noise and vibrations, while improving fuel economy and low-end torque. LCV is scheduled to replace the direct-injected 2.4 L throughout North American GM products within a year. Engine production started in April 2012 at GM's Tonawanda Engine plant.

The new combustion system developed with GM's proprietary computational fluid dynamics (CFD) analysis software features a higher compression ratio which helps improve fuel efficiency and has improved knock resistance. The engine redline is 7000 rpm.

The balance shafts are relocated from the cylinder block to oil pan module. The two-piece steel-aluminum oil pan features in-pan integrated oil-pump assembly driven by the balance shaft with a shorter inverted-tooth chain. Other improvements include inverted-tooth chain driving the camshaft, forged steel crankshaft, cast aluminum bedplate with main bearing cap inserts made of iron, high-pressure fuel rail with rubber-isolated assembly, acoustically shielded plastic cover for the intake manifold, and structurally enhanced aluminum camshaft cover and front cover. These improvements helped reduce noise intensity by 40% compared to the 2.4 L engine and change the noise signature into a higher frequency above 2,000 Hz. The engine also uses a variable-displacement oil pump and an actively controlled thermostat. Direct injection reduces emissions by 25%, while continuous cam phasing eliminates the need for an EGR system. Maximum engine speed is listed at 7000 rpm.

Displacement for the 2.5 L engine is 2,457 cc with an  bore and  stroke. Compression ratio is 11.3:1.

LKW
Same as the LCV but features Intake Valve Lift Control (IVLC) system provides two-stage variable valve lift in addition to continuous variable timing. Continuously commanded by engine control unit, the valve rocker arm switches between high-lift and low-lift profiles on the camshaft, actuated by an oil control valve through a two-feed stationary hydraulic lash adjuster, allowing for either 4.0 or 10.5 mm lift. It also features a start-stop system. Maximum engine speed is listed at 7000 rpm.

HCCI
At Tech Show Torino 2008, GM Powertrain Europe announced the ignition-less HCCI (Homogeneous Charge Compression Ignition) mode of the direct injection version of 2.2 L engine. HCCI version is equipped with two-step adjustable valve lift with variable cam phasing and advanced ECU with cylinder pressure sensors, uses lean burn cycle similar to that of a diesel engine, and is claimed to further reduce fuel consumption by 15%.

See also

 Family 0 engine
 Family 1 engine
 List of GM engines

References

 

General Motors engines
Opel engines
Gasoline engines by model
Straight-four engines